Frederick Leonard Clark (March 19, 1914 – December 5, 1968) was an American film and television character actor.

Early years
Born in Lincoln, California, Clark was the son of Fred Clark Sr. He attended Stanford University with plans to become a doctor, but participation in a college production of Yellow Jack diverted his attention to acting. He changed his major to drama and later received a scholarship to the American Academy of Dramatic Arts. While there, he was elected his class's most promising actor.

Career
Clark made his film debut in 1947 in The Unsuspected.  His 20-year film career included nearly seventy films and numerous television appearances. As a supporting player, with his gruff voice, intimidating build, bald head and small moustache beneath an often scowling visage,  he was often cast as a testy film producer, crime boss, landlord, employer, doctor, or general.  In 1942 during World War II Clark joined the United States Navy and served as an aviator. He later transferred to the United States Army and served with the Third Army in Europe until the end of the war. 

Among his films were Ride the Pink Horse (1948), Mr. Peabody and the Mermaid (1948), Flamingo Road (1949), White Heat (1949), Sunset Boulevard (1950), A Place in the Sun (1951), How to Marry a Millionaire (1953), The Court-Martial of Billy Mitchell (1955), How to Be Very, Very Popular (1955), Daddy Long Legs (1955), Auntie Mame (1958), and Visit to a Small Planet (1960).

Although he continued making films during the 1960s (most notably a large role in Hammer Film Productions' The Curse of the Mummy's Tomb in 1964 and John Goldfarb, Please Come Home in 1965) he was more often seen on television, as a regular on The George Burns and Gracie Allen Show as neighbor Harry Morton (until 1953) and guest roles on The Twilight Zone, The Beverly Hillbillies, Going My Way, The Addams Family, and I Dream of Jeannie. In 1962, he and Bea Benaderet, another Burns and Allen veteran, played Mr. and Mrs. Springer in the episode "Continental Dinner," the series finale of the CBS sitcom Pete and Gladys, starring Harry Morgan and Cara Williams. Clark had a regular but short-lived role in the 1966 ABC sitcom The Double Life of Henry Phyfe as the "Central Intelligence Service" boss of a hapless conscripted spy played by comedian Red Buttons.

Clark's Broadway credits included Absence of a Cello (1964), Viva Madison Avenue! (1960), Romanoff and Juliet (1957), Ringside Seat (1938), What a Life (1938), and Schoolhouse on the Lot (1938).

Personal life
Clark was married to actress Benay Venuta from 1952–1962, then model Gloria Glaser from 1966 until his death from liver disease in Santa Monica, California.
 
Clark has a star on the Hollywood Walk of Fame for his work in television, at 1711 Vine Street.

Complete filmography

The Unsuspected (1947) - Richard Donovan
Ride the Pink Horse (1947) - Frank Hugo
Fury at Furnace Creek (1948) - Bird
Hazard (1948) - Lonnie Burns
Two Guys from Texas (1948) - Dr. Straeger
Cry of the City (1948) - Lt Collins
Alias Nick Beal (1949) - Frankie Faulkner
The Younger Brothers (1949) - Daniel Ryckman
Flamingo Road (1949) - Doc Waterson
White Heat (1949) - The Trader, aka Winston
So You Want to Get Rich Quick (1949, Short) - Fastidious Ferguson (uncredited)
So You Want to Be an Actor (1949, Short) - Mr. Frisbee (uncredited)
The Lady Takes a Sailor (1949) - Victor Santell (uncredited)
The Amazing Mr. Malone (1950, TV Movie)
Return of the Frontiersman (1950) - Ryan
The Eagle and the Hawk (1950) - Basil Danzeeger
Sunset Boulevard (1950) - Sheldrake
The Jackpot (1950) - Mr. Andrew J. Woodruff
Mrs. O'Malley and Mr. Malone (1950) - Tim Marino
The Lemon Drop Kid (1951) - Moose Moran
A Place in the Sun (1951) - Bellows
Hollywood Story (1951) - Sam Collyer
Meet Me After the Show (1951) - Timothy 'Tim' Wayne
Three for Bedroom "C" (1952) - Johnny Pizer
Dreamboat (1952) - Sam Levitt
The Stars Are Singing (1953) - McDougall
The Caddy (1953) - Mr. Baxter / Old Skinhead
Here Come the Girls (1953) - Harry Fraser
How to Marry a Millionaire (1953) - Waldo Brewster
Living It Up (1954) - Oliver Stone
Abbott and Costello Meet the Keystone Kops (1955)  - Joseph Gorman, aka Sergei Toumanoff
Daddy Long Legs (1955) - Griggs
How to Be Very, Very Popular (1955) - B.J. Marshall
The Court-Martial of Billy Mitchell (1955) - Col. Moreland
Miracle in the Rain (1956) - Steven Jalonik
The Birds and the Bees (1956) - Horace Hamilton
The Solid Gold Cadillac (1956) - Clifford Snell
Back from Eternity (1956) - Crimp
Joe Butterfly (1957) - Col. E.E. Fuller
The Fuzzy Pink Nightgown (1957) - Police Sergeant McBride
Don't Go Near the Water (1957) - Lt. Cmdr. Clinton T. Nash
Mardi Gras (1958) - Al Curtis
Auntie Mame (1958) - Dwight Babcock
The Mating Game (1959) - Oliver Kelsey
It Started with a Kiss (1959) - Maj. Gen. Tim O'Connell
Visit to a Small Planet (1960) - Maj. Roger Putnam Spelding
Bells Are Ringing (1960) - Larry Hastings
The Passionate Thief (1960) - L'americano
La moglie di mio marito (1961) - Mr. Bietti
A porte chiuse (1961)  - Xatis, il procuratore generale
My Darling Judge (1961, TV Movie)
Boys' Night Out (1962) - Mr. Bohannon
Hemingway's Adventures of a Young Man (1962) - Mr. Turner
Zotz! (1962) - Gen. Bullivar
Young Girls of Good Families (1963) - Mr. Whitehall
Move Over, Darling (1963) - Mr. Codd (Hotel Manager)
The Curse of the Mummy's Tomb (1964) - Alexander King
John Goldfarb, Please Come Home! (1965) - Heinous Overreach
Sergeant Deadhead (1965) - General Rufus Fogg
When the Boys Meet the Girls (1965) - Bill Dennis
Dr. Goldfoot and the Bikini Machine (1965) - D.J. Pevney
Due Marines e un Generale (1965) - Gen. Zacharias
Eve (1968) - Lucky Burke
Skidoo (1968) - A Tower Guard (released posthumously)
The Horse in the Gray Flannel Suit (1968) - Tom Dugan
I Sailed to Tahiti with an All Girl Crew (1969) - "Generous" Josh (released posthumously)
Eddie (1971, TV Movie) - Chief Pike (final film role; released posthumously)

References

External links

 
 
 

American male film actors
American male television actors
1914 births
1968 deaths
Deaths from hepatitis
People from Lincoln, California
Male actors from Los Angeles
20th-century American male actors
Warner Bros. contract players